Marcia Ashong is a United Kingdom - born Ghanaian entrepreneur and lawyer recognized for her role in advocating for women representation in boardrooms. She is the executive director of TheBoardroom Africa (TBR Africa), and Brace Energy.

Early life and education 
Marcia was born in the United Kingdom to a Fante family.

She attended University of Minnesota where she attained a Bachelor of Arts in International Relations & Political Science, University of Exeter where she attained an LLB Hons. (Law) at and University of Dundee where she attained Master of Laws (LLM) in Energy Law and Policy.

Career 
Marcia Ashong is the Founder and executive director of TheBoardroom Africa (TBR Africa), and Brace Energy.

She has led businesses in four continents and in 2017 was  named in Ghana's 20 Top Under 40 business leaders. In 2010, she established the Ghana Oil Club (GOC), a body that enables petroleum and energy professionals to deliberate on Ghana's Petroleum and Energy Sectors. In June 2020, Ashong was featured in the Visual Collaborative Polaris catalogue, under the Amplified series for humanities and innovation, she was interviewed alongside others from around the world.

Achievements 

 Human Rights Fellowship Winner.

References

Ghanaian businesspeople
Living people
Alumni of the University of Dundee
Year of birth missing (living people)